John H. Wallace was an American football coach.  He served as the head football coach at Rutgers University from 1924 to 1926.  In his first season, the team went 7–1–1 and Wallace was signed to a three-year contract.  But over the next two years the team's fortunes sagged, and in February, 1927, the Rutgers University Athletic Board replaced Wallace.  His overall record was 12–14–1 in three seasons.  In March 1928, Wallace hired a former Bergen County prosecutor to pursue a legal claim that the university had violated the terms of the three-year contract.

Wallace coached football at Rutherford High School in Rutherford, New Jersey from 1919 to 1922.  He became an assistant coach at Rutgers under George Sanford in 1923.

Head coaching record

College

References

Year of birth missing
Year of death missing
American football quarterbacks
Rutgers Scarlet Knights football coaches
Rutgers Scarlet Knights football players
High school football coaches in New Jersey
People from Rutherford, New Jersey
Players of American football from New Jersey
Rutherford High School (New Jersey) alumni